"That's What I Like About You" is a song written by Kevin Welch, Wally Wilson, and John Hadley. It was originally recorded by James House for his 1990 album Hard Times for an Honest Man.

It was later recorded by American country music artist Trisha Yearwood. It was released in December 1991 as the third single from her debut album Trisha Yearwood. The song reached number 8 on the US Billboard Hot Country Singles & Tracks chart.

Music video
The music video was directed by Gerry Wenner and premiered in late 1991.

Charts

Weekly charts

Year-end charts

References

1991 singles
James House (singer) songs
Trisha Yearwood songs
Songs written by Kevin Welch
Song recordings produced by Garth Fundis
MCA Records singles
Songs written by Wally Wilson
1990 songs